Noginsky (masculine), Noginskaya (feminine), or Noginskoye (neuter) may refer to:
Noginsky District, a district of Moscow Oblast, Russia
Noginsky (rural locality) (Noginskaya, Noginskoye), name of several rural localities in Russia